Sychikha is a rural locality (a village) in Yenangskoye Rural Settlement, Kichmengsko-Gorodetsky District, Vologda Oblast, Russia. The population was 17 as of 2002.

Geography 
Sychikha is located 75 km southeast of Kichmengsky Gorodok (the district's administrative centre) by road. Leshukovshchina is the nearest rural locality.

References 

Rural localities in Kichmengsko-Gorodetsky District